Arumugam Vengatarakoo is a Malaysian politician and was a member of the State Assembly of Kedah for the seat of Bukit Selambau from 2008 to 2009.

Arumugam was elected in the 2008 election as an independent, but immediately joined the People's Justice Party in the new Pakatan Rakyat coalition government of Kedah. He was appointed to the Executive Council to represent Kedah's Indian community in the state government. However, in February 2009, Arumugam resigned from the Executive Council and the State Assembly, triggering a by-election.

Before entering politics, Arumugam was a member of the Royal Malaysian Air Force.

Election results

References

Malaysian people of Indian descent
Living people
People's Justice Party (Malaysia) politicians
Independent politicians in Malaysia
Members of the Kedah State Legislative Assembly
Kedah state executive councillors
Year of birth missing (living people)